Lasiopetalum cordifolium, is a species of flowering plant in the family Malvaceae and is endemic to the south-west of Western Australia. It is an erect shrub with hairy stems, heart-shaped leaves and pink, cream-coloured or white flowers.

Description
The petals are reduced to small scaled or lobes and there are five stamens. Flowering occurs from September to December.

Taxonomy
Lasiopetalum cordifolium was first formally described in 1837 by Stephan Endlicher in Enumeratio plantarum quas in Novae Hollandiae ora austro-occidentali ad fluvium Cygnorum et in sinu Regis Georgii collegit Carolus Liber Baro de Hügel from specimens collected from King George Sound. The specific epithet (cordifolium) means "heart-leaved".

Distribution and habitat
This lasiopetalum grows on rocky outcrops, slopes and ridges in the Avon Wheatbelt, Esperance Plains and Jarrah Forest biogeographic regions of south-western Western Australia.

Conservation status
Lasiopetalum cordifolium is listed as "not threatened" by the Government of Western Australia Department of Biodiversity, Conservation and Attractions.

References

cordifolium
Malvales of Australia
Flora of Western Australia
Plants described in 1837
Taxa named by Stephan Endlicher